The 2020 mayoral election of Dhaka South City Corporation was held on 1 February 2020. A total of 6 major candidates participated in the election. The result was a victory for the Awami League candidate Sheikh Fazle Noor Taposh. Ishraque Hossain of the Bangladesh Nationalist Party received the second highest number of votes.

It was one of the first major election in Bangladesh conducted entirely using electronic voting machines (EVMs) alongside the 2020 Dhaka North City Corporation election. Previously the country had made only limited use of EVMs. The ruling party, the Awami League supported the adoption of EVMs. Leaders of other parties including the Bangladesh Nationalist Party leaders said they feared the machines would be used for vote rigging. One concern expressed was that the machines do not have a voter-verified paper audit trail.

Results

References 

2020 elections in Bangladesh
Local elections in Bangladesh
Dhaka